Carabus marietti bischoffi is a subspecies of ground beetle in the  Carabinae family that is endemic to Turkey. The subspecies are either brown or green coloured.

References

marietti bischoffi
Beetles described in 1848
Endemic fauna of Turkey